Thelymitra tigrina, commonly called the tiger orchid or tiger sun orchid, is a species of orchid that is endemic to the south-west of Western Australia. It has a single narrow leaf and up to fifteen small yellow flowers with small brown spots.

Description
The lobe on top of the anther is short and covered with small bumps. The flowers are self-pollinated and open on hot, sunny days. Flowering occurs from November to January.

Taxonomy and naming
Thelymitra tigrina was first formally described in 1810 by Robert Brown and the description was published in Prodromus Florae Novae Hollandiae et Insulae Van Diemen. The specific epithet (tigrina) is a Latin word meaning "of tigers", referring to the colour of the flowers.

Distribution and habitat
The tiger orchid grows in dense scrub in near-coastal, winter-wet scrub. It is found between Perth and Albany with a disjunct population near Esperance.

Conservation
Thelymitra tigrina is classified as "not threatened" in Western Australia by the Western Australian Government Department of Parks and Wildlife.

References

External links
 

tigrina
Endemic orchids of Australia
Orchids of Western Australia
Plants described in 1810